Diabo is a town in central Ivory Coast. It is a sub-prefecture and commune of Botro Department in Gbêkê Region, Vallée du Bandama District.

In 2014, the population of the sub-prefecture of Diabo was 26,272.

Villages
The 27 villages of the sub-prefecture of Diabo and their population in 2014 are:

Notes

Sub-prefectures of Gbêkê
Communes of Gbêkê